Sakhalin Ainu is an extinct Ainu language, or perhaps several Ainu languages, that was or were spoken on the island of Sakhalin, now part of Russia.

History and present situation 
The Ainu of Sakhalin appear to have been present on Sakhalin relatively early. Linguistic evidence shows that proto-Ainu was spoken in southern Sakhalin and northeastern Hokkaido and expanded from this region into the rest of Hokkaido, the Kurils and partially northern Honshu. Later Sakhalin Ainu expanded from southern Sakhalin into northern Sakhalin and possibly the Amur region. A study by Lee and Hasegawa from the Waseda University using linguistic, archeologic and genetic evidence, found that the Ainu are significantly linked to the Okhotsk culture of northern Hokkaido.

Oral history records Ainu displacement of a people in central Sakhalin that they called the Tonchi, who, based on toponymic evidence, were Nivkh.

After World War II, when Sakhalin came under Soviet control, all but 100 of the Ainu living in Sakhalin were deported to Japan. The last Ainu household on the island died out in the 1960s. The language survived longer in Japan, going extinct in 1994 with the death of Take Asai.

Phonology and writing 
Sakhalin Ainu differed from Hokkaido Ainu in having long vowels.

In Japan, final /x/ was written as a small katakana h with an echo vowel, and is transliterated as h. Thus アㇵ ah, イㇶ ih, ウㇷ uh, エㇸ eh, オㇹ oh.

Dialects 
Sakhalin Ainu may have been more than a single language. Information about linguistic diversity throughout Sakhalin island and among Sakhalin Ainu dialects is scant.

At present, two can be said to be the best documented dialects – the dialect from the settlement of Rayciska (Japanese: 来知志 – ライチシ), on the western coast of Sakhalin on the Strait of Tartary near modern Uglegorsk and the dialect from Tarayka (Japanese: 多来加 – タライカ), facing the Gulf of Patience near Poronaysk on the eastern coast.

Linguistic material on both dialects comes in the shape of transcriptions, recordings and transliterations of narratives and conversations. These were elicited from Ainu native speakers who lived either on Sakhalin or in Hokkaido, after they had been deported from Russia to Japan. A number of narratives from the south-eastern coast of Sakhalin were also elicited by Piłsudski from native speakers living in the Ainu settlements of Ay, Hunup, Takoye, Sieraroko, Ocohpoka, Otasan down to Tunayci, nearby today's Tunay Lake (Russian: Озеро Тунайча). These dialects appear to be strikingly similar to the Tarayka dialect. Nevertheless, the eastern coastal variety of Tarayka is reported to be divergent from other southern varieties. Scanty data from Western voyages at the turn of the 19th–20th century suggest there was also great diversity further north.

References

Ainu languages
Languages extinct in the 1990s
Russian Ainu people
Extinct languages of Asia
Sakhalin